Paani Ch Madhaani is a 2021 Indian Punjabi-language romantic comedy-drama film directed by Vijay Kumar Arora and produced by Mani Dhaliwal, Sunny Raj, and Prabhjot Sidhu under the banner of Dara Films Entertainment. The film, which stars Gippy Grewal and Neeru Bajwa, is set in the 1980s and is the story of a group of Punjabi musicians who travel to London to make their mark. It was released on 5 November 2021 to coincide with the Diwali festival in India.

Premise
The story is about a flop singer Gulli and his group who focus on shortcuts (jugaad) for gaining success.

Cast
 Gippy Grewal as Gulli
 Neeru Bajwa as Sohni
 Karamjit Anmol
 Gurpreet Ghuggi 
 Iftikhar Thakur
 Harby Sangha
 Rupinder Rupi
 Sukhwinder Chahal as Gulli's father
 Gurpreet Bhangu as Gulli's mother
 Honey Mattu
 Shivam Sharma
 Parveen Aawara
 Nirmal Rishi
Special appearance
 Vinita Sharma as party guest
 Bikramjit Gurm as party guest
 Malkit Rauni
 Patrick Loh as Rich Chinese couple

Production
Paani Ch Madhaani was announced on 16 June 2020 by lead actor Gippy Grewal. Gippy Grewal and co-star Neeru Bajwa last appeared together in the 2011 film Jihne Mera Dil Luteya. Principal photography began on 6 October 2020 in London. The film is a period romantic comedy-drama set in the 1980s.

Release
Initially the film was scheduled for release on 12 February 2021 but it was then pushed back to 21 May 2021 due to the COVID-19 pandemic. Due to the closure of theaters the May release was then postponed even further. The film was finally released on 5 November 2021 to coincide with the Diwali festival.

Soundtrack

The soundtrack album was released on Humble Music. The music was composed by Jatinder Shah and all the lyrics were written by Happy Raikoti. The first single, "Jean", which is sung by Gippy Grewal and Afsana Khan, was released on 19 October 2021. The song "VCR" was released on 30 October 2021.

Box office
Paani Ch Madhaani opened with a gross of  crore worldwide on its first day of release.

The film has grossed  crore worldwide .

References

External links
 

2021 films
2021 drama films
Indian drama films
Punjabi-language Indian films
Films shot in London
Films postponed due to the COVID-19 pandemic
Films scored by Jatinder Shah
Indian romantic comedy films
Films set in London
Films set in 1980